The Theban Tomb TT28 is located in El-Assasif. It forms part of the Theban Necropolis, situated on the west bank of the Nile opposite Luxor. The tomb is the burial place of the ancient Egyptian official, Hori.

Hori was an officer of the estate of Amun during the Ramesside Period.

In November 2018, an Egyptian archaeological excavation team uncovered the original entrance of the tomb; in addition to another tomb, that of Thaw-Rakht-If. Two huge wooden anthropoid sarcophagi were found, identified as Padiset and Nesmutamu; they are attributed to another occupant of the tomb of a later period and not Hori. The mission uncovered two wooden statues of the deceased, five painted wooden funerary masks, and a collection of ushabti figurines made of faience, wood, burnt clay, along with a papyrus containing Chapter 125 of the Book of the Dead. A cache of mummies were also found in the tomb. The tomb wall was decorated and included scenes of the owner's wife, Kharousekhmet-Nefret, singer of Amun-Re.

See also
 List of Theban tombs

References

Buildings and structures completed in the 13th century BC
Theban tombs